Jonas Källman (born 17 July 1981) is a Swedish handballer who plays for S.L. Benfica and the Swedish national team.

Honours and awards

BM Ciudad Real
 Liga ASOBAL 2003–2004, 2006–2007, 2007–2008, 2008–2009, 2009–2010
 Runner-up Liga ASOBAL 2004–2005, 2005–2006
 Copa del Rey 2002–2003, 2007–2008
 Runner-up Copa del Rey 2005–2006, 2008–2009
 Copa ASOBAL 2003–2004, 2004–2005, 2005–2006, 2006–2007, 2007–2008, 2010–2011
 Supercopa de España 2004–2005, 2007–2008, 2010–2011
 Runner-up Supercopa de España 2008–2009, 2009–2010
 EHF Champions League 2005–2006, 2007–2008, 2008–2009
 Runner-up EHF Champions League 2004–2005
 EHF Men's Champions Trophy 2005–2006, 2006–2007, 2008–2009

BM Atlético de Madrid
 Supercopa de España: 2011–2012
 Runner-up Supercopa de España: 2012–13
 Copa del Rey: 2011–12, 2012–13
 Runner-up Liga ASOBAL: 2011–12, 2012–13
 Runner-up EHF Champions League: 2011–12
 Runner-up Copa ASOBAL: 2013
 IHF Super Globe: 2012

MOL-Pick Szeged
 K&H Férfi Kézilabda Liga: 2017-18, 2020-21
 Magyar Kézilabdakupa: 2018-2019
 Runner-up K&H Férfi Kézilabda Liga: 2014-15, 2015-16, 2016-17
 Runner-up Magyar Kézilabdakupa: 2014-15, 2015-16, 2016-17 2017-18
 EHF Cup: 2013-14

S.L. Benfica
 EHF European League: 2021–22

National team
 3rd Men's Junior World Handball Championship 2001
 Runner-up Olympic Games 2012

References

1981 births
Living people
Swedish male handball players
Liga ASOBAL players
BM Ciudad Real players
Handball players at the 2012 Summer Olympics
Olympic handball players of Sweden
Olympic silver medalists for Sweden
Olympic medalists in handball
Medalists at the 2012 Summer Olympics
People from Växjö
IFK Skövde players
SC Pick Szeged players
Swedish expatriate sportspeople in Spain
Expatriate handball players
S.L. Benfica handball players
Sportspeople from Kronoberg County
21st-century Swedish people